GTP-binding protein Rhes is a protein that in humans is encoded by the RASD2 gene.

This gene encodes a Ras-related protein that is produced largely in the striatum. The product of this gene binds to GTP and possesses intrinsic GTPase activity. The gene belongs to the Ras superfamily of small GTPases. The exact function of this gene is unknown, but most striatum-specific mRNAs characterized to date encode components of signal transduction cascades.

References

Further reading